Claudia Alexis Barrionuevo (born September 4, 1991) is an Argentine model and beauty pageant titleholder who was crowned Miss Argentina 2015 and represented her country at the Miss Universe 2015 pageant.

Personal life

Miss Argentina 2015
Barrionuevo was crowned Miss Universo Argentina 2015 at the conclusion of the pageant held on October 23, 2015. The Salta native represented Argentina in the Miss Universe 2015 pageant on December 20, 2015, in Las Vegas, Nevada, US. She didn't place.

References

External links

 Official Miss Universe Argentina website

Living people
Argentine beauty pageant winners
Miss Universe 2015 contestants
1991 births